This is a list of current and defunct automobile manufacturers of South Korea.

Current manufacturers

Foreign manufacturers building in South Korea

Former manufacturers
 AD Motors (2010–2013)
 Asia Motors (1965–1999) (Merged into Kia Motors)
 ATT R&D (2000–2016)
 Cony Motor Company (2014–2017)
 Daewoo Motors (1972–2011) (Replaced by GM Korea)
 Keohwa (1974–1984) (Acquired by SsangYong Motor)
 Proto Motors (1997–2017)
 Saehan Motors (1976–1983) (Acquired by Daewoo Motors)
 Shinjin Motors (1955–1984)
 Sibal (1955–1963)

See also
List of automobile manufacturers of Japan
List of automobile manufacturers of China

References

Automotive industry in South Korea
South Korea